Kevin S. Zucker (born June 26, 1952) is an American wargame designer, historian, author, and musician.

SPI
Kevin Zucker started playing board wargames as a teenager in La Jolla, California, and began to design his own games. In 1971 he found his first job in the wargaming world as co-founder and editor of the first two issues of Conflict magazine. Zucker then moved to New York to work for the wargame publisher Simulations Publications Inc. (SPI). Zucker worked his way up to Production Manager, and over two years, oversaw production of 24 issues of Strategy & Tactics plus the games enclosed in each issue, and 48 boxed games.

OSG
Zucker left SPI in January 1976, but stayed in New York and spent his time working in bookstores and studying music. Zucker met with other ex-SPI employees, and the group started to plan a Napoleonic wargame that would be presented as a spiral-bound book. However the logistics of this format were beyond the ability of the group to create economically, and in the end, the group changed the design to a ziplock bag game titled Napoleon at Bay. In order to publish the game, Zucker formed the company Tactical Studies Group, and convinced George Blagowidow, the owner of Hippocrene Books and distributor of SPI wargames, to buy 800 copies. On the basis of that sale, Zucker convinced SPI's printer to print 2000 copies. Zucker went to Origins '78 with the ziplock game and sold 250 copies.

Due to the similarity of "Tactical Studies Group" and "Tactical Studies Rules" (TSR — the publishers of Dungeons & Dragons), Zucker changed the name of his company to Operational Studies Group (OSG). At the 1978 Origins Awards, Napoleon at Bay was a finalist for the Charles S. Roberts Award for "Best Pre-Twentieth Century Game". The following year, Zucker's game Napoleon at Leipzig won the Charles S. Roberts award for "Best Pre-Twentieth Century Game".

Avalon Hill and college
In 1979, Zucker left OSG and moved to Baltimore, Maryland to join game publisher Avalon Hill. In his absence, OSG carried on for a year, then went out of business. At Avalon Hill, Zucker designed The Struggle of Nations, which was a finalist for the Charles S. Roberts Award for "Best Pre-Twentieth Century Game of 1981." Zucker left Avalon Hill after a year to go back to college to study music. In addition to his studies, he designed 1809: Napoleon's Danube Campaign for Victory Games; the game was also a Charles S. Roberts Award finalist, for "Best Pre-Twentieth Century Game of 1983."

In 1985, while still at school, Zucker was approached by Ed Wimble to provide a wargame for his new game company called Clash of Arms. The result was The Emperor Returns, published in 1986.

Zucker graduated with a Bachelor of Arts in Music and Visual Arts in 1985.

OSG resurrected
Zucker eventually refounded the moribund OSG as a publisher of operational-level wargames about Napoleon's campaigns, and published Bonaparte in Italy: The Defense of Mantua and the Quadrilateral in 2000. Zucker was inducted into the Clausewitz Award Hall of Fame in 2003 for his contributions to wargaming.

In October 2008, Zucker announced that OSG was going out of business at the end of the year, but after a year-long hiatus, the company recommenced production with The Coming Storm, which was a finalist for the Charles S. Roberts Award for "Best Ancient to Napoleonic Era Wargame of 2010".

In addition to designing Napoleonic games for OSG, Zucker also became interested in flower essence therapy, and created The Flower Essence Game for the Flower Essence Society in 2018.

Published games

SPI
Bloody Ridge (in Island War Quad), 1974, SPI
Napoleon's Last Battles, 1975, SPI; reprinted in 1984 by TSR, and in 1995 by Decision Games

OSG
Napoleon at Bay, 1978; reprinted in 1983 by Avalon Hill, and by OSG in 1997
Battles of the Hundred Days, 1979; reprinted in 1983 by Avalon Hill
Arcola, 1979; reprinted (as Battle for  Italy) in 1983 by Avalon Hill
Napoleon at Leipzig, 1979; reprint in 1989 and 1994 by Clash of Arms
Bonaparte in Italy, 1980; reprinted in 2000
1806: Rossbach Avenged, 1998
La Guerre de l'Empereur (The Emperor's War) 1998
Last Days of the Grande Armée, 1999
Highway to the Kremlin, 2001
The Sun of Austerlitz, 2003
Seven Days of 1809, 2004
Four Lost Battles, 2005
Napoleon at the Crossroads, 2006
The Habit of Victory, 2007
The Coming Storm, 2010
The Last Success, 2012
La Patrie en Danger, 2014
Napoleon Against Russia, 2015
Napoleon’s Last Gamble, 2016
Napoleon’s Quagmire, 2017
Napoleon’s Resurgence, 2018
Napoleon Retreats, 2019
Napoleon's Wheel, 2020
Napoleon Invades Spain, 2021

Avalon Hill
Struggle of Nations, 1982

Victory Games
1809: Napoleon on the Danube, 1984

Clash of Arms
The Emperor Returns, 1986
1807: The Eagles Turn East, 1994

Self-published
The Flower Essence Game, 2018

Historical Research Series
Nr. 1, 1813: The Year That Doomed the Empire, 2007; Second Edition, 2016
Nr. 2, 1806: The Autumn of No Return, 2008
Nr. 3, 1807: Stalemate in the Snow, 2008
Nr. 4, 1807: Triumph Without Victory, 2008
Nr. 5, 1806: The Coming Storm, 2009
Nr. 6, 1809: A Fatal Necessity, 2012
Nr. 7, 1814: The Fall of Empire, 2016 (with Louis Bélanger)

References

1952 births
Living people
Board game designers